The European spruce bark beetle (Ips typographus), is a species of beetle in the weevil subfamily Scolytinae, the bark beetles, and is found from Europe to Asia Minor and some parts of Africa.

Biology of the species

Morphology

Elytral declivity is slightly shiny, with 4 teeth on each margin side. The third tooth is the biggest and club like on its top. The egg is yellowish-white. The larva is white and legless. The pupa is also white.

Life cycle and interactions

Bark beetles are so named because they reproduce in the inner bark, living and dead phloem tissues, of trees. Adult beetles hibernate in forest litter and host trees when environmental conditions are not favorable for reproduction. When conditions are right, they travel up to half a mile in search of a vulnerable host. Once the host is located, the adult burrows through the weakened bark in order to build tunnels where they can mate and lay eggs. They release pheromones to attract more individuals to the host tree. Two to five weeks after contamination, they may migrate to another host and repeat the process. Once the larvae hatch, they feed and pupate under the bark. Up to three generations are produced per year.

Bark beetles communicate with one another using semiochemicals, compounds or mixtures that carry messages. Some electrophysiological and behavioral statistics show that bark beetles can not only sense olfactory signals directly from other bark beetles, but also some compounds from trees.

It is also possible that beetles are attracted to the pheromone ipslure. They are also thought to be attracted to ethanol, one of the byproducts of microbial growth in dead woody tissues.

Bark beetles can form a symbiotic relationship with certain Ophiostomatales fungi. These phloem-feeding bark beetles use phloem-infesting fungi as an addition to their diet.

Dispersal ability

European bark beetles have the ability to spread quickly over large areas. Some scientists hypothesize that long-distance movements originating from the Iberian Peninsula may have contributed to their invasion of northern Norway spruce forests. Movements like this can happen when various environmental factors such as severe storms, drought, or mass fungal infections damage or kill host trees. Trees in the genera Picea (spruce), Abies (fir), Pinus (pine), and Larix (larch) are the bark beetles' trees of choice. The most recent spruce bark beetle invasive outbreaks are found mainly in fallen, diseased or damaged Norway spruce. Healthy trees use defenses by producing resin or latex, which might contain several insecticidal and fungicidal compounds that kill or injure attacking insects. However, under outbreak conditions, the beetles can overwhelm the tree's defenses.

Though it specializes on Norway spruce, it is not found throughout the tree's range. It may not be able to persist in the northernmost spruce forests due to inadequate climatic oscillations. Other researchers argue that the beetle populations that have evolved in such regions have an active, directed host searching ability and are not equipped for long-range dispersal.

Impact

Ecological

The European spruce bark beetle has a significant impact on both the ecological and economic environment of Norway spruce forests. Together with storm events, bark beetle outbreaks are thought by some to be one of the most important natural disturbances in this region. Some scientists consider this beetle to be a keystone species, in part because it has an unusually high number of relationships with other organisms in the community and because it changes its environment so drastically.

Outbreak species, in general, assist in the renewal of the forest. Spruce beetles are detritivores. They feed on and break down dead plant matter, returning essential nutrients to the ecosystem. Also, they further the evolution of stronger, more resistant trees by instigating a range of adaptations to ward off their attacks.

Economic

The bark beetles of the Norway spruce forests are associated with various types of fungi, who each have different basic ecological roles. Several fungal pathogens can be transmitted to spruces by the invasive beetles. One of the most damaging is a species of blue stain fungus, Ophiostoma polonicum, which can kill healthy trees by hindering the upward flow of water, wilting its foliage. It also stains the wood with blue streaks, which destroys its commercial value. The results of such beetle outbreaks could be devastating for the lumber industry in that area because of the amount of time required for natural regression to take place. When this cycle affects the lumber industries by attacking spruce tree farms, they become known as serious pests.

Detection

Spruce beetles usually infest the lower and middle parts of trunks. Trees that have been attacked are easy to recognize by concentrations of brown dust from bark at the basal areas of stems and trunks. However, sometimes apparently infected trees with green crowns can be without bark because of larval and woodpecker activity. Other common ways that infection can be detected is the presence of red-brown dust (frass) in bark crevices, many round exit holes, or small pitch tubes extruding from the bark. Large populations can be detected from a distance by patches of red foliage.

Conservation
Interventions for beetle outbreaks are controversial in locations such as the Šumava National Park in the Bohemian Forest of the Czech Republic. Some authorities suggest that outbreaks be allowed to run their course, even at the expense of most of the forest. Others, including the lumber industry, request intervention. Some experts argue that salvage logging tends to have a greater negative effect on the vegetation than the bark beetle outbreak alone. A study of the effects of forestry interventions on the herb and moss layers of infested mountain spruce forests suggest that without intervention the forests do eventually recover. Salvage logging also had negative effects on the composition of species, delaying recovery.

Prevention and control methods

Several methods have been proposed to prevent the start of beetle outbreaks. Some suggest using “trap trees” at the beginning of each reproductive cycle. This should be done in March, May, and in late June or early July. The trap trees should be debarked when distinct larval galleries with small larvae are found. Another method is clearcutting, removing sections of trees at the first signs of infestation. Pheromone traps can be used. Removal of attractive material, such as logs with bark, weakened trees, and windthrow, may help prevent outbreaks.

See also
 Frass

References

External links

Species Profile- European Spruce Bark Beetle (Ips typographus), National Invasive Species Information Center, United States National Agricultural Library.  Lists general information and resources for European Spruce Bark Beetle.

Scolytinae
Beetles of Europe
Beetles described in 1758
Woodboring beetles
Insect pests of temperate forests
Articles containing video clips
Taxa named by Carl Linnaeus